Nasirdin Isanovich Isanov 7 November 1943 – 29 November 1991) was a Kyrgyz politician who served as the first Prime Minister of Kyrgyzstan from 30 August 1991 to 29 November 1991.

Biography
In 1966 he graduated from the Moscow Engineering and Construction Institute, and for several years he worked in the construction industry.

After joining the Communist Party in 1969, he rose through party structures, becoming first secretary of the Osh regional Komsomol. In 1983 he became Construction Minister in the Kyrgyz Soviet Republic. He was the Vice President of Kyrgyzstan from December 1990 to January 1991. In January 1991 he became Prime Minister of the Republic of Kyrgyzstan.

He was killed on 29 November 1991 in a car crash in the outskirts of the capital. He is buried in Ala-Archa cemetery in Bishkek. In 2003, a monument in honor of Isanov was erected in Erkindik Boulevard. He is the only Prime minister of Kyrgyzstan to die in office.

References

1943 births
1991 deaths
People from Osh Region
Communist Party of Kirghizia politicians
Members of the Congress of People's Deputies of the Soviet Union
People's commissars and ministers of the Kirghiz Soviet Socialist Republic
Prime Ministers of Kyrgyzstan
Vice presidents of Kyrgyzstan

Recipients of the Order of the Red Banner of Labour
Road incident deaths in Kyrgyzstan
Burials at Ala-Archa Cemetery